Agustín Oscar "Chivo" Rossi (born 18 October 1959) is an Argentine Justicialist Party politician. Rossi has held a number of important political posts throughout his career, most notably as Minister of Defense during the presidencies of Cristina Fernández de Kirchner (2013–2015) and Alberto Fernández (2019–2021). He was also a National Deputy for his native Santa Fe, and served as leader of the Front for Victory parliamentary bloc in the lower house from 15 February of 2023 is the Chief of the Cabinet of Ministers of Alberto Fernandez.

Early life and education
Rossi was born in Vera, a small city in the north of Santa Fe Province, where he spent his early youth. He moved to Rosario when he was 17 years old, and graduated as a civil engineer at the National University of Rosario.

Political career

Provincial career
Rossi was a member of the Peronist University Youth in the 1970s, and joined the Justicialist Party in the 1980s. He elected to the Rosario Deliberative Council in 1987, but returned to his private practice in the 1991. He returned to politics in 2001, was elected to the Deliberative Council in 2002, and presided said body from 2004 to 2005.

In the 2005 legislative elections he ran for a seat in the Lower House of Congress for the Front for Victory, the largest faction of the Justicialist Party, formed by supporters of President Néstor Kirchner. His campaign capitalized on, and was centered on gaining support for, the successful policies implemented by Kirchner on the national level; Rossi, who was not yet well known in the province, presented himself as "Kirchner's candidate." The Front for Victory party list headed by Rossi came in second (with 33% of votes) after the Socialist Party list headed by Hermes Binner (43%).

Congressional terms and Ministry of Defense
He then became the head of the Front for Victory bloc in the lower house of Congress. In that capacity, he took on the task of imposing party discipline while rallying legislative support of Kirchner's policies; he stated that "the bloc [belonging to the ruling party] has the fundamental role of being the legislative arm of the government. I cannot conceive a [government party] block that has doubts or criticism for the government's projects. Society tells us: 'I choose you to strengthen the course of action initiated by the President." He also courted controversy with his rhetoric, notably in August 2010 when he described lawmakers who presented a bill that sought reverse a government decision to revoke an expired license for the Fibertel internet service provider, as "lawyers" for the Clarín Group (Fibertel's parent company); there have been ongoing controversies between Clarín and Kirchnerism since 2008 over a number of issues.

Rossi was a candidate in the FpV primary for the governorship of Santa Fe in the 2007 elections. His rival within the party was Rosario-born National Deputy and former Foreign Relations Minister Rafael Bielsa. The Mayor of Rafaela, Omar Perotti, campaigned for some time as well, but finally gave up and turned to support Bielsa. In the classical caudillist fashion that has prevailed in Argentina’s last century of politics, although some in the party, including Bielsa, would have rather negotiated on a consensus candidacy, Rossi insisted on conducting a primary election. Rossi also stated that he wanted Bielsa's sister María Eugenia (then vice-governor of Santa Fe), on his party list, though he instead chose Jorge Fernández, former Minister of Education during the governorship of Víctor Reviglio. Bielsa was eventually chosen as the party's candidate in primary elections on July 1, 2007, but subsequently lost the election to Socialist Hermes Binner.

Rossi continued in his role as Majority Leader of the Chamber of Deputies as head of the Front for Victory bloc, which retained a majority in the Chamber. President Cristina Fernández de Kirchner nominated him to the post of Minister of Defense of Argentina on 30 May 2013.

Electoral history

Executive

Legislative

References

External links

Official website of the Ministry of Defense (in Spanish)

1959 births
Living people
People from Vera Department
Argentine people of Italian descent
National University of Rosario alumni
Argentine civil engineers
Justicialist Party politicians
Members of the Argentine Chamber of Deputies elected in Santa Fe
Defense ministers of Argentina
Chiefs of Cabinet of Ministers of Argentina